The 1920 United States Senate election in South Dakota took place on November 2, 1926. Incumbent Republican Senator Peter Norbeck ran for re-election to a second term. In the Republican primary, he faced former State Senator George J. Danforth, who had the support of Governor Carl Gunderson in an intra-party split between Norbeck and Gunderson. Norbeck defeated Danforth by a wide margin, and then faced former State Representative Charles J. Gunderson in the general election. Norbeck defeated Gunderson in a landslide to win re-election.

Democratic Primary
Former State Representative Charles J. Gunderson won the Democratic nomination unopposed.

Republican Primary

Candidates
 Peter Norbeck, incumbent U.S. Senator
 George J. Danforth, former State Senator

Results

General election

Results

References

South Dakota
1926
1926 South Dakota elections